Lyla is a feminine given name. Notable people with the name include:

People
 Lyla Berg (born 1951), Hawaiian politician
 Lyla Elliott (born 1934), Australian politician
 Lyla Foy (aka WALL), London songwriter and solo artist, who garnered acclaim from performing in Black Cab Sessions 
 Lyla Pinch Brock, Canadian Egyptologist
 Lyla Rocco (1933–2015), Italian film actress

Fictional characters
 Lyla Garrity, in American TV series Friday Night Lights
 Lyla Lerrol, supporting character in Superman comics
 Lyla, one of the main characters in Australian TV series Mako Mermaids and one of the hundreds of mermaids from Mako Island
 Lyla Novacek, in 2007 film August Rush

See also 
 Lyla (album), a 2003 album by jazz bassist Avishai Cohen
 "Lyla" (song), a 2005 single by Oasis